Sjöstrand may refer to:

Arnold Sjöstrand (1903–1955), Swedish actor and film director
Carl Eneas Sjöstrand (1828–1906), Swedish sculptor
Johannes Sjöstrand (born 1947), Swedish mathematician
Östen Sjöstrand (1925–2006), Swedish poet, writer and translator
Sven-Erik Sjöstrand, born 1954, is a Swedish Left Party politician, member of the Riksdag 1998–2006
Tore Sjöstrand (born 1921), former Swedish athlete, winner of 3000 m steeplechase at the 1948 Summer Olympics